Worcester Raiders Football Club is a football club based in Worcester, Worcestershire, England.

History
Worcester Raiders were formed in 2001 as a youth club, joining the Worcester & District Football League in 2009 upon the formation of a senior side. In 2013, Worcester Raiders joined the West Midlands (Regional) League Division Two, gaining promotion in their first season in the league system. In 2019, Worcester Raiders won Division One, gaining promotion to the Premier Division. Worcester Raiders entered the FA Vase for the first time in 2020–21. At the end of the 2020–21 season the club were transferred to Division One of the Hellenic League.

In the 2021–22 season, Worcester Raiders finished second behind Studley. Despite a 3-0 loss to Hereford Pegasus in the playoff final, Worcester Raiders were promoted to the Premier Division of the Hellenic League following the closure of Walton Casuals. in the Southern League Premier South, leading to the reprieval of Merthyr Town and Cinderford Town The result was Worcester being promoted as 2nd in the playoffs.

Grounds
Worcester Raiders initially played at Claines Lane.

On 29 July 2020, English Premiership rugby union club Worcester Warriors confirmed Worcester Raiders would move into Sixways Stadium, with Worcester Warriors' co-owners Colin Goldring and Jason Whittingham becoming joint majority owners of Worcester Raiders in the process. In September 2022 the future of the club was left uncertain after the gates to their ground were locked, as a result of Worcester Warriors' financial problems. This effectively left Worcester Raiders homeless with nowhere to play their home matches. However it was later confirmed that the Raiders had reached an agreement with the Warriors' administrators to remain at Sixways.

Records
Best FA Vase performance: Second qualifying round, 2022–23
Best FA Cup performance: First qualifying round, 2022–23

References

Association football clubs established in 2001
2001 establishments in England
Football clubs in England
Football clubs in Worcestershire
Sport in Worcester, England
West Midlands (Regional) League
Hellenic Football League